Arriola is a surname. Notable people with the surname include:

Aly Arriola (born 1987), Honduran soccer player
Eduardo Arriola (born 1972), Honduran soccer player
Elizabeth P. Arriola (1928–2002), Guamanian educator and politician
Ezequiel Arriola (born 1982), Argentine soccer player
Fortunato Arriola (1827–1872), Mexican painter
Gus Arriola (1917–2008), Mexican-American comic strip cartoonist and animator
Héber Arriola (born 1980), Argentine soccer player
Joaquin C. Arriola (born 1925), Guamanian politician
Julia Benites Arriola (born 1952), Mexican-Mescalero-American sculptor and curator
Manolita Arriola (1919–2004), Mexican singer and actress
Paul Arriola (born 1995), American soccer player
Pepito Arriola (1896–1954), Spanish child prodigy pianist and master violinist
Sylvio Arriola, Canadian actor
Theresa H. Arriola, Northern Mariana Islander cultural anthropologist